JumpStart SpyMasters: Unmask the Prankster is a personal computer game made by Knowledge Adventure where the user must stop the Prankster. As in other JumpStart games, one has to solve educational problems to complete the game.

Gameplay
There are three locations in the game:

HQ
HQ = This is where the user goes after completing a mission
Lab = Here the user connects molecules with words on them organized according to their lexical category
 Spy Masters Online = This is an Internet game where one has to get the flag from the other team

Adventure Valley
Dell's = This a fast food restaurant where you have to get the right amount of mustard in 3 blenders.
Recording Studio = Here you must get instrument to touch the right letter to spell the requested word.
Software Company = Here you must get to the words related to the requested word above before the time runs out.
Robot Factory = Here you must sort out computer chips with a word on them to get them 4 in a row. When you use up all the space you and have 'data' you need you win.
Clock tower = an area similar to the Recording Studio.
Airport = An area similar to the Software Company.
Power Plant = An area very alike to the Lab.

Ancient Ruins
 Library = Here you must find what the pictures mean and change to a word.
 Map Room = Place is similar to the Robot Factory.

Abandoned Amusement Park
 Puzzle Fun House = An area identical to the Library.
 Octopus Ride = An area similar to the Dell's but the only difference you is you shoot cannonballs

Other Areas
These places can only accessible by Jet pack or during pre-mission.
Training Area = The User can only go there during the pre- mission. It's near the ocean
Other Areas = Some are between the airport and Dell's, on rivers or near the ruins
(Note: At the end of the credits is a poster of this game's sequel. Around it was more areas unshown in the game.)

Cast
 Jess/Jo: Paula Tiso
 Zack: Phil Snyder
 Sally: Kim Mai Guest
 Botley/Max: Dee Bradley Baker
 TJ: Brianne Siddall
 Dr.X: Lex Lang

Characters

Adventurers
 Botley - AndroidXL2 ("Botley"), of JumpStart Adventures 3rd Grade: Mystery Mountain & JumpStart Typing, is a robot. In the game, Botley speaks in an older tone of voice.
 T.J. - Thomas James Adams, of JumpStart Adventures 4th Grade: Sapphire Falls, is the newest member of the Adventurers in the game and seems to be very excited. In the game, his green T-shirt turns into a tan sweater with a green vest.
 Sally - Sally Chu, also of JumpStart Adventures 4th Grade: Sapphire Falls. In the game, Sally's ponytail turns plain short.
 Jo - Jo Hammet, of JumpStart Adventures 5th Grade: Jo Hammet, Kid Detective, seems to like skateboarding and rollerblading (as seen in JumpStart 5th Grade and JumpStart Adventure Challenge - a bonus disc that was included with several games in the past and which was also released under the names Far Out Field Trips, Ultimate Field Trips, and Extreme Field Trips in several of the Advanced packages of those same games.).
 Zack - Zack is from JumpStart Adventures 6th Grade: Mission Earthquest. In the game, Zack's sweater turns into a T-shirt.
 Jess - Jess is Zack's sister and is also from JumpStart Adventures 6th Grade: Mission Earthquest. In the game, Jess' hair is black instead of red.

Villains
 Max Masters/Prankster - Max used to be the youngest Adventurer until he was kicked out. In the game, he plays pranks on (or tries to get revenge against) the Adventurers as the Prankster. He later gets his revenge in the sequel.

Minor Characters/Unseen
People - Some were seen after the Naptime mission

Unseen
Dr.X - From JumpStart Adventures 5th Grade: Jo Hammet, Kid Detective. He was not mentioned in the game but his name was seen in the credits.

See also
JumpStart

External links
 Knowledge Adventure's Official JumpStart Site

2001 video games
JumpStart
Spy video games
Video games developed in the United States
Windows games
Windows-only games
Single-player video games